Andre Breitbarth (born 6 April 1990) is a German judoka. He competed at the 2016 Summer Olympics in the men's +100 kg event, in which he was eliminated in the first round by Iurii Krakovetskii.

References

External links
 
 
 

1990 births
Living people
German male judoka
Olympic judoka of Germany
Judoka at the 2016 Summer Olympics
Judoka at the 2015 European Games
European Games competitors for Germany
20th-century German people
21st-century German people